Matthew Graham (born in New Orleans, Louisiana) is an American professional poker player from Houston, Texas, who is a two time World Series of Poker bracelet winner, He won his first bracelet at the 2008 World Series of Poker in the $1,500 Limit Hold'em Shootout event. During the next year at the 2009 World Series of Poker, he won his second bracelet in the $10,000 World Championship Pot Limit Omaha event.

Graham in a member of Team UB as a sponsored professional poker player at the online cardroom Ultimate Bet.

As of 2010, his total live tournament winnings exceed $1,700,000.

World Series of Poker bracelets

Notes

External links
Team UB profile

Living people
World Series of Poker bracelet winners
American poker players
Place of birth missing (living people)
People from New Orleans
Year of birth missing (living people)